Boston explosions may refer to:
 Boston Marathon bombing, 2013
 Massachusetts gas explosions, 2018